The Flute Concerto is a concerto for flute and orchestra by the American composer Christopher Rouse.  The work was jointly commissioned by Richard and Jody Nordlof for flutist Carol Wincenc and by Borders Group for the Detroit Symphony Orchestra.  It was completed August 15, 1993 and premiered October 27, 1994 at Orchestra Hall in Detroit, with conductor Hans Vonk leading Carol Wincenc and the Detroit Symphony Orchestra.  The piece—specifically the third movement—is dedicated to the memory of James Bulger, an English toddler who was infamously murdered in 1993 by two ten-year-old boys.

Composition

Structure
A performance of the Flute Concerto lasts approximately 23 minutes.  The work is composed in five movements:
Amhrán
Alla Marcia
Elegia
Scherzo
Amhrán

Style and influences
The work contains a number of Celtic music influences.  In the program notes to the score, Rouse commented on the particularly Irish influences, saying:

Instrumentation
The concerto is scored for a solo flute and orchestra comprising three flutes, two oboes, two clarinets, two bassoons (2nd doubling on contrabassoon), four French horns, two trumpets, three trombones, tuba, harp, timpani, percussion (three players), strings (violins I & II, violas, violoncellos, and double basses).

Dedication
Regarding the dedication of the piece to James Bulger, Rouse wrote:

Reception
Geoffrey Norris of Gramophone praised the piece, saying, "It expresses the shock and incomprehension that we all experienced at that appalling, senseless crime, but at the same time it enshrines the beauty and innocence of an infant life so cruelly snuffed out."  Michael Tumelty of The Herald lavished the work with praise, saying "...not only is it a brilliant concert piece [...], but it is actually a masterpiece."  Tumelty specifically praised the third movement, adding, "In the achingly poignant music of that Elegy, there are two purely orchestral moments, where first the music subsides then, gathering its passion and strength, resumes its statement in a huge crescendo with the entire orchestra piling in at what amounts to an anguished, collective protest at the horror. It is a shattering moment."  James R. Oestreich of The New York Times also noted the third movement, calling it "the big, pulsating heart of the piece" and writing, "This is a deeply stirring monument, carried for long moments by the strings and, eventually, the whole orchestra, as the flute basically steps aside."  BBC Music Magazine'''s Stephen Maddock praised the influence of Celtic music, commenting, "The outer movements – both entitled ‘Ànhran’, Gaelic for song, in recognition of the composer’s Celtic roots – are especially likeable, while the central Adagio confronts the terrible Bulger case more in sorrow than in anger."

Michael Dervan of The Irish Times was somewhat more critical of the concerto and called it "all a bit self-consciously accessible."  Steve Metcalf of the Hartford Courant called the piece "a slighter work" in regards to Rouse's repertoire, but nevertheless described it as "nicely put together."  In 2006, David Patrick Stearns of The Philadelphia Inquirer'' lauded the relevance of the concerto in a post-9/11 world, despite describing Rouse's use of Celtic influences as "without irony" and noting similarities to Henryk Górecki's Symphony No. 3.  Stearns ultimately called the concerto "an island of truth" and complimented the flute writing, saying, "The five-movement piece positions the soloist more as a protagonist than a competitor with a series of dialogues and soliloquies."

References

Concertos by Christopher Rouse
1993 compositions
Rouse
20th-century classical music
Music commissioned by the Detroit Symphony Orchestra